Gennady Petrovich Yudin (27 March 1923, Moscow – 13 November 1989, Moscow) was a Soviet and Russian stage and film actor. Laureate of Stalin Prize (1951).

Filmography

 The Russian Question (1947) as Parker
 Encounter at the Elbe (1949) as Kurt Dietrich
 They Have a Motherland (1950) as Kurt Kraus
 Taras Shevchenko (1951) as Agitator
 The Composer Glinka (1951) as Hector Berlioz
 Admiral Ushakov (1953) as Capt. Dmitry Senyavin
 Attack from the Sea (1953) as Capt. Dmitry Senyavin
 Silvery Dust (1953) as Dick Jones
 Mysterious Discovery (1954) as Guriy Gagarka
 The Frigid Sea (1955) as Crewman Stepan Shaparov
 Murder on Dante Street (1956) as actor, partner of Madlen
 Carnival Night (1956) as Jazz band Conductor
 A Lesson in History (1957) as Henrik Lange, worker-communist
 Vasily Surikov (1959) as Lunyov
 Northern Story (1960) as Shchedrin 
 Hussar Ballad (1962) as Shura's commanding officer
 Spring on the Oder (1968) as Sereda
 Waterloo (1970) as Grenadier Chactas
 Destiny (1977) as german military doctor

References

External links

1923 births
1989 deaths
20th-century Russian male actors
Male actors from Moscow
Stalin Prize winners
Russian male film actors
Russian male stage actors
Russian male voice actors
Soviet male film actors
Soviet male stage actors
Soviet male voice actors
Burials at Donskoye Cemetery